Rush Copley Medical Center in Aurora, Illinois, is a 210-bed hospital in the greater Fox Valley area. It is named after Ira Clifton Copley, who donated over $2 million for the original hospital. It is part of the Rush University System for Health, which includes Rush University Medical Center in Chicago and Rush Oak Park Hospital.

The Cancer Care Center has been designated as a Comprehensive Community Cancer Center by the American College of Surgeons Commission on Cancer.

Rush Copley Neuroscience Services provides specialized care to the greater Fox Valley area.

The Heart and Vascular Institute is an accredited Chest Pain Center for the care of patients with acute coronary from the Society of Chest Pain Centers.

Emergency Services is a designated Level II Trauma Center that serves nearly 70,000 patients annually.

See also 
 Rush University

References

External links 
 
 Rush University System for Health

Hospital buildings completed in 1995
Hospitals in Illinois
Buildings and structures in Kane County, Illinois
Buildings and structures in Aurora, Illinois
Rush University
Yorkville, Illinois